Poker with Pistols is a 1967 Italian Spaghetti Western film directed by Giuseppe Vari.

Cast 

 George Hilton as Ponson 
 George Eastman as Lucas 
 Annabella Incontrera as Lola 
 Mimmo Palmara as Master  
 José Torres as Lazar

References

External links

1967 films
Films directed by Giuseppe Vari
Spaghetti Western films
1967 Western (genre) films
Films scored by Lallo Gori
1960s Italian films